The  is an archaeological site consisting of a series of large shell middens and the remains of an adjacent settlement from the Jōmon period. The site is in what is now part of the city of Hakodate in Oshima Subprefecture on the island of Hokkaido in northern Japan. It has been protected by the central government as a Historic Site since 13 August 2001.

Early history
The Ōfune Site was a community with over 100 pit dwellings, including smaller family homes and some larger homes that were inhabited from 3500 BC to 2000 BC. The dates of the site's habitation correspond to the early and middle Jōmon period of Japanese history. The community was positioned alongside the Pacific Ocean, enabling easy access to fishing and whaling grounds and providing an avenue for the site's people to trade extensively with other communities in the Tōhoku region. Pottery from the Tōhoku region and central Hokkaido was found in the sites burial mound, providing basis for the site's function as a trade center.

Modern history
The Ōfune Site was discovered during surveying work in 1996. Initial discoveries included a large pit dwelling, embankments, and a storage pit. The site was placed under the protection of the central government as a Historic Site on 13 August 2001. On 29 December 2002, 70,000 excavated artifacts from the site were damaged or destroyed when a fire broke out in an exhibition room.

The submission currently resides on the Tentative List, with the decision to be included in the list to be announced in May 2021.

See also
 Hakodate Jōmon Culture Center
 List of Historic Sites of Japan (Hokkaido)

References

Archaeological sites in Japan
History of Hokkaido
Jōmon period
Archaeological parks
Hakodate